Hedycarya arborea, commonly known as pigeonwood, porokaiwhiri, and poporokaiwhiri is an endemic tree of New Zealand. Found on both the North and South islands of the country, the tree grows to a height of 15 metres. The leaves are oval shaped with shallow serrations. Ripe fruits turn red and the plant received its common name back when it was assumed that the New Zealand wood pigeon particularly favoured them, based on observations of the birds eating the fruit. It has since been discovered that the New Zealand wood pigeon does not prefer these berries, and tends to eat them as a 'famine food' when better fare is not available.

References

Monimiaceae
Trees of New Zealand